The episodes for the CBS television sitcom Cosby aired from September 16, 1996 to April 28, 2000, with 96 total produced spanning four seasons.

Series overview

Episodes

Season 1 (1996–1997)

Season 2 (1997–1998)

Season 3 (1998–1999)

Season 4 (1999–2000)

Lists of American sitcom episodes